Denis Baum (born April 13, 1987) is a German footballer who plays as a goalkeeper for VfL Gerstetten.

References

External links

1987 births
Living people
German footballers
VfB Stuttgart II players
1. FC Heidenheim players
3. Liga players
Association football goalkeepers
People from Eberbach (Baden)
Sportspeople from Karlsruhe (region)
Footballers from Baden-Württemberg